Paoli Hospital, part of Main Line Health, is a 231-bed, not-for-profit, acute care hospital in Paoli, Pennsylvania. In 2014, the hospital was re-accredited as a Level II Trauma Center, the only one in Chester County. Founded in 1913, Paoli Hospital is named among U.S. News & World Report’s Best Hospitals in the Philadelphia region. In 2021, Paoli Hospital also received the Press Ganey Guardian of Excellence Award® for patient experience for inpatient care.

Paoli Hospital and its outpatient centers in King of Prussia, Exton and Collegeville offer a full range of services and programs, including orthopaedic, maternity, heart and stroke care; a cancer center; The Holloway Breast Center; emergency services and level II trauma center; primary care services and outpatient services.

Statistics
:
 Employees: 1,210
 Licensed beds: 231
 Bassinets: 11
 ER visits: 36,980
 Total discharges: 13,769
 Births: 1,983
 Total surgeries: 7,101

References

External links
Paoli Hospital website
Main Line Health website

Hospitals in Pennsylvania
Buildings and structures in Chester County, Pennsylvania